Plus One Animation Studios is an animation studio located in Seoul, South Korea. Their biggest contribution is for the Mike Judge series King of the Hill, with upwards of 80+ episodes animated, but they also animated the Disney-era episodes of Doug and some episodes of Recess. Shows and movies they have been involved in include:
101 Dalmatians: The Series
Beavis and Butt-head + Film (Beavis and Butt-head Do America)
Fish Hooks (seasons 1-3)
Daria
Double Dragon
Doug + Film (Doug's 1st Movie)
Grandma and Her Ghosts
The Head
Mighty Ducks
Hercules: Zero to Hero + Hercules: The Animated Series
King of the Hill
Lloyd in Space
Madeline
The Mask: Animated Series
PB&J Otter
Recess + Films (Recess: Taking the Fifth Grade & Recess All Growed Down)
Stanley
Street Sharks
Super Dave: Daredevil for Hire
The Twisted Tales of Felix the Cat

References

External links
 Plus One Animation Homepage (in Korean & English)

South Korean animation studios
Mass media companies established in 1991
Mass media in Seoul
South Korean companies established in 1991